Khari Cain (born April 19, 1978), professionally known as Needlz, is an American record producer and songwriter.

Early life and career
Khari Cain was born on April 19, 1978 in Lansing, Michigan. He began to DJ while an undergraduate in Florida Agricultural and Mechanical University and Florida State University. He majored in the graduate music business program at [[New York University and originally intended to pursue a career in artist and repertoire (A&R). After attaining an internship with Bad Boy Records, he was inspired to begin a career in record production. With the help of A&R Folayan Knight, Needlz associated with Black Entertainment Television (BET) and MTV and created theme songs for Rap City and Suckafree Sundays, respectively. Fellow record producer Swizz Beatz assisted Needlz to "exposure" by collaborating in album production, including Cassidy's I'm a Hustla and Swizz Beatz One Man Band Man.

Production style
Needlz chiefly produces songs in the hip hop genre. He describes his style as "an oxymoron: clean and dirty at the same time". He uses Akai MPC2000XL and Pro Tools to produce beats and utilizes Kurzweil K2661 and the Roland MKS-80 for synthesizers.
He has endorsed the Native Instruments Maschine.

Production discography

References

External links
 Official website

Living people
American hip hop record producers
Florida A&M University alumni
Florida State University alumni
Midwest hip hop musicians
Musicians from Lansing, Michigan
Steinhardt School of Culture, Education, and Human Development alumni
Businesspeople from Lansing, Michigan
1978 births